In mathematics, weak topology is an alternative term for certain initial topologies, often on topological vector spaces or spaces of linear operators, for instance on a Hilbert space. The term is most commonly used for the initial topology of a topological vector space (such as a normed vector space) with respect to its continuous dual. The remainder of this article will deal with this case, which is one of the concepts of functional analysis.

One may call subsets of a topological vector space weakly closed (respectively, weakly compact, etc.) if they are closed (respectively, compact, etc.) with respect to the weak topology. Likewise, functions are sometimes called weakly continuous (respectively, weakly differentiable, weakly analytic, etc.) if they are continuous (respectively, differentiable, analytic, etc.) with respect to the weak topology.

History 

Starting in the early 1900s, David Hilbert and Marcel Riesz made extensive use of weak convergence. The early pioneers of functional analysis did not elevate norm convergence above weak convergence and oftentimes viewed weak convergence as preferable. In 1929, Banach introduced weak convergence for normed spaces and also introduced the analogous weak-* convergence. The weak topology is also called topologie faible and schwache Topologie.

The weak and strong topologies 

Let  be a topological field, namely a field with a topology such that addition, multiplication, and division are continuous. In most applications  will be either the field of complex numbers or the field of real numbers with the familiar topologies.

Weak topology with respect to a pairing 

Both the weak topology and the weak* topology are special cases of a more general construction for pairings, which we now describe. 
The benefit of this more general construction is that any definition or result proved for it applies to both the weak topology and the weak* topology, thereby making redundant the need for many definitions, theorem statements, and proofs. This is also the reason why the weak* topology is also frequently referred to as the "weak topology"; because it is just an instance of the weak topology in the setting of this more general construction.

Notation.

Definition.

However, for clarity, we now repeat it.

Definition.

This shows that weak topologies are locally convex.

Assumption. We will henceforth assume that  is either the real numbers  or the complex numbers .

Canonical duality 

Note in particular that  is just another way of denoting  i.e. .

Assumption. If  is a vector subspace of the algebraic dual space of  then we will assume that they are associated with the canonical pairing .

The weak and weak* topologies 

We call the topology that  starts with the original, starting, or given topology (the reader is cautioned against using the terms "initial topology" and "strong topology" to refer to the original topology since these already have well-known meanings, so using them may cause confusion). We may define a possibly different topology on  using the topological or continuous dual space , which consists of all linear functionals from  into the base field  that are continuous with respect to the given topology.

Definition.

This topology is also called the weak* topology.

We give alternative definitions below.

Weak topology induced by the continuous dual space 

Alternatively, the weak topology on a TVS  is the initial topology with respect to the family . In other words, it is the coarsest topology on X such that each element of  remains a continuous function.

From this point of view, the weak topology is the coarsest polar topology.

Weak convergence 

In this case, it is customary to write

or, sometimes,

Other properties 

If  is a normed space, then the dual space  is itself a normed vector space by using the norm

This is the topology of uniform convergence. The uniform and strong topologies are generally different for other spaces of linear maps; see below.

Weak-* topology 

The weak* topology is an important example of a polar topology.

A space  can be embedded into its double dual X** by

Thus  is an injective linear mapping, though not necessarily surjective (spaces for which this canonical embedding is surjective are called reflexive).

Weak-* convergence

for all . In particular, a sequence of  converges to  provided that

for all . In this case, one writes

Weak-* convergence is sometimes called the simple convergence or the pointwise convergence. Indeed, it coincides with the pointwise convergence of linear functionals.

Properties 

If  is a separable (i.e. has a countable dense subset) locally convex space and H is a norm-bounded subset of its continuous dual space, then H endowed with the weak* (subspace) topology is a metrizable topological space. However, for infinite-dimensional spaces, the metric cannot be translation-invariant.

Properties on normed spaces

Moreover, the closed unit ball in a normed space  is compact in the weak topology if and only if  is reflexive.

In more generality, let  be locally compact valued field (e.g., the reals, the complex numbers, or any of the p-adic number systems).

If  is a normed space, a version of the Heine-Borel theorem holds. In particular, a subset of the continuous dual is weak* compact if and only if it is weak* closed and norm-bounded. This implies, in particular, that when  is an infinite-dimensional normed space then the closed unit ball at the origin in the dual space of  does not contain any weak* neighborhood of 0 (since any such neighborhood is norm-unbounded). Thus, even though norm-closed balls are compact, X* is not weak* locally compact.

If a normed space  has a dual space that is separable (with respect to the dual-norm topology) then  is necessarily separable. If  is a Banach space, the weak-* topology is not metrizable on all of  unless  is finite-dimensional.

Examples

Hilbert spaces 

Consider, for example, the difference between strong and weak convergence of functions in the Hilbert space . Strong convergence of a sequence  to an element  means that

In contrast weak convergence only demands that

for all functions  (or, more typically, all f in a dense subset of  such as a space of test functions, if the sequence {ψk} is bounded).

For example, in the Hilbert space , the sequence of functions

form an orthonormal basis. On the other hand, by the Riemann–Lebesgue lemma, the weak limit exists and is zero.

Distributions 

One normally obtains spaces of distributions by forming the strong dual of a space of test functions (such as the compactly supported smooth functions on ). Thus one is led to consider the idea of a rigged Hilbert space.

Weak topology induced by the algebraic dual 

Operator topologies

The naming of such topologies depends on the kind of topology one is using on the target space  to define operator convergence .

For instance, if  is a normed space, then this topology is defined by the seminorms indexed by :

In particular, see the weak operator topology and weak* operator topology.

See also 
 Eberlein compactum, a compact set in the weak topology
 Weak convergence (Hilbert space)
 Weak-star operator topology
 Weak convergence of measures
 Topologies on spaces of linear maps
 Topologies on the set of operators on a Hilbert space
 Vague topology

References

Bibliography
 
  
  
 
  
  
  
  
 

General topology
Topology
Topology of function spaces